A History of Fly Fishing for Trout is a fly fishing book written by John Waller Hills published in London in 1921.

Synopsis
A History of Fly Fishing for Trout is the first book to trace the history of fly fishing from its very beginning, with chapters on Early Sporting Literature, Early Fly Fishing in France, and identifying all the artificial flies mentioned by early writers. The book includes a useful bibliography for scholars interested in further historical research.

Reviews
 In Notable Angling Literature (1945) James Robb devotes an entire chapter to Hills and says the following about A History:
It covers the period from the close of the 15th century to the beginning of the 20th, from the Treatyse to Andrew Lang.  The story is very well told and must have involved considerable research.  Generous in his appreciations, he can always be relied upon to give an unbiased judgement.  The book sets a high standard and one can refer to him with confidence on moot points in angling literature on trout fly-fishing.

 In The Well Tempered Angler (1965) Arnold Gingrich listed Hill's A History of Fly Fishing for Trout as one of three books to refer to when seeking guidance on angling literature.
All three of these writers—Robb, Hills and Marston—get at the real meaning of the old writers, quote them and characterize them, point out the significance of their contributions, and show both where they are still valid and where later developments have improved them.

 Andrew Herd credits Hill with the first attempt to codify the history of fly fishing, albeit Hill's work shows a distinctly British bias and disregard for other European influences.
 Hills and A History is extensively quoted and referenced in the following works,:
 John McDonald, Quill Gordon (1972)
 Arnold Gingrich, The Fishing in Print (1974)
 Paul Schullery, American Fly Fishing—A History (1996)
 Andrew Herd, The Fly (2003)

Contents
 Chapter I – Sporting Literature in France and England – 1
 Chapter II – The Treatise of Fishing with an Angle – 16
 Chapter III – From The Treatise to The Compleat Angler – 36
 Chapter IV – Early Fly Fishing in France – 49
 Chapter V – Charles Cotton and His Contemporaries – 56
 Chapter VI – From Cotton to Stewart – 82
 Chapter VII – Stewart and the Upstream School – 99
 Chapter VIII – The Dry Fly – 114
 Chapter IX – The Evolution of the Trout Fly – 141
 Chapter X – The Evolution of the Trout Fly (Contd.) – 170
 Chapter XI – The Literature of Fly Fishing – 191
 Bibliography – 222
 Index – 231

Other Editions

Further reading

See also
 Bibliography of fly fishing

External links
 Online Version Internet Archive

Notes

1921 non-fiction books
Angling literature
British books
Recreational fishing in the United Kingdom